Cosmetira is a monotypic genus of hydrozoans belonging to the family Mitrocomidae. The only species is Cosmetira pilosella.

The species is found in Northern Europe and Alaska.

References

Mitrocomidae
Hydrozoan genera
Monotypic cnidarian genera